The 2008 North African Cup of Champions was the first edition of the competition initiated by the North African Football Union (UNAF). Tunisian side Club Africain were crowned champions after beating Moroccan side FAR Rabat 3-2 on penalties in the final, after both legs ended 0-0.

Participating teams

1 Al Ahly will not compete as they have commitments with the Club World Championship in Japan.

Semi-final

Draw

First Legs
 Club Africain 2 - 1  Al Ittihad (17 December)

 JS Kabylie 1 - 1  FAR Rabat (19 December)

Second Legs
 Al Ittihad 1 - 1  Club Africain (24 December)

 FAR Rabat 1 - 0  JS Kabylie (26 December)

Club Africain advance to the Final with an aggregate score of 3-2

FAR Rabat advance to the Final with an aggregate score of 2-1

3rd/4th-place play-off

There has been an ongoing feud as to who will take 3rd place. Al Ittihad were originally given 3rd place as JS Kabylie did not play a penalty shootout, as they claim they won the tie on away goals. The Algerian club also said that Ittihad had an unfair advantage playing at home in a one-off match. As a result, CAF will meet on 19 January to discuss the match.

The FNAF later decided that the two clubs would share 3rd place, and therefore share the $75,000 prize fund.

Final

First leg

Second leg

References

External links
 North African Champions' Cup 2008/09

2008 in African football
2008
2008–09 in Moroccan football
2008–09 in Algerian football
2008–09 in Libyan football
2008–09 in Tunisian football
2008–09 in Egyptian football